= Fuset (surname) =

Fuset is a surname. Notable persons with that name include:

- Lola Caballero Fuset (born 2000), Spanish athlete
- Lorenzo Martínez Fuset (1899-1961), Spanish lawyer and officer
- Pere Fuset (born 1982), Spanish politician
